Ciudad is the Spanish word for City

Ciudad may also refer to:
La Ciudad (archaeological site), Hohokam ruins in Phoenix, Arizona
La Ciudad, district of Durango City, Mexico
La ciudad, novel by Mario Levrero 1970
La Ciudad The City (1998 film)
Ciudad (film), directed by Balthasar Burkhard
 Ciudad (band), Philippines band Rakista TV series
 La Ciudad, nickname for Mexico City, Mexico
"La Ciudad",  song by Odesza from A Moment Apart 2017